Dipper Harbour is a community on Route 790 in Saint John County, New Brunswick, Canada.

History

Dipper Harbour is located on the Bay of Fundy, 5.24 km E of Maces Bay: Musquash Parish, St. John County: named for a species of duck known as the bufflehead or dipper duck: PO 1855-1939: in 1866 Dipper Harbour was a fishing and farming community with about 23 resident families: in 1871 it had a post office, a church and a population of 200.

Notable people

Education

The following are a list of public schools in the community:

See also
List of communities in New Brunswick

References

Communities in Charlotte County, New Brunswick